Frederick Burdette Spencer (born December 20, 1961), sometimes known by the nickname Fast Freddie, is an American former world champion motorcycle racer. Spencer is regarded as one of the greatest motorcycle racers of the early 1980s.

Motorcycle racing career

Early years
Spencer was born in Shreveport, Louisiana. He was a racing prodigy who began racing at the age of four, competing in dirt track events near his hometown of Shreveport. After winning the 1978 250cc U.S. National Novice Class Road Racing Championship for first year professionals, Spencer was contracted to ride for the American Honda racing team in the AMA Superbike Championship. He gave Honda their first-ever super bike victory when he won the Road America round of the 1980 AMA Superbike Championship.

Spencer gained international prominence at the 1980 U.S. versus Britain Transatlantic Trophy match races when he won two legs at Brands Hatch, defeating World Champions Kenny Roberts and Barry Sheene in the process. Spencer went on to finish third in the 1980 Superbike championships and second to Eddie Lawson in 1981. In 1981, he split his time between the AMA Superbike series, and the European Grand Prix circuit, helping Honda develop the exotic, oval-cylindered NR500 four-stroke Grand Prix bike.

Grand Prix world championships
By 1982, he had been promoted full-time to Honda's Grand Prix team, who by then had given up on the NR500 and developed the NS500 three cylinder, two-stroke. In 1983, Spencer won his first 500cc World Championship at the age of 21, becoming the youngest person to win the title, a distinction previously held by Mike Hailwood.His record has since been surpassed by Marc Marques in 2013.

The 1983 season would be remembered as one of the most dramatic title chases in the history of Grand Prix racing; Honda's Spencer and Yamaha's Kenny Roberts fought back and forth for the points lead with each of them earning six victories. The season culminated at the penultimate round in Sweden when the two riders collided on the last lap. Roberts ran off the track leaving Spencer to sprint to the finish line and victory. Roberts won the last race but Spencer finished second, securing his first world title by two points.

In 1984, Honda developed a radically new V4 NSR500 that featured the fuel tank under the engine and the expansion chambers under a false tank above the engine. Teething problems and injuries from crashes hindered Spencer's defense of his crown and he was relegated to fourth place in the championship. In spite of this, he still managed to win three times with the NSR500, and twice more on the NS500 three cylinder machine.

1985 proved to be a historic year for Spencer. He began the season by winning the prestigious season opening Daytona 200. Spencer also won the Formula 1 and 250cc classes, making him the only rider to win all three divisions in a single year. Spencer also competed in both the 250cc and 500cc Grand Prix World Championships, winning both titles in the same year. That made him the fifth (and last) rider ever to win in the 500cc and the next class down and, due to class changes, the only rider to win in both 500cc and 250cc in one year. His career was cut short by wrist injuries that some believe were caused by the physical strain of competing in two championships during a single season.

After his historic 1985 season, Spencer never won another Grand Prix race. He retired from Grand Prix racing at the beginning of 1988, although there were a couple of GP comeback attempts, in 1989 and 1993.

Later career

He returned to race in the AMA Superbike Championship in the 1990s, winning three races. He was eighth in 1991, riding a Honda for Two Brothers Racing, and went one better in 1992. In 1995 he raced a Fast By Ferracci Ducati to ninth, and at the end of the year took over the works Ducati from Mauro Lucchiari in Superbike World Championship.

Spencer raced under several different marques during his racing career, winning his first Superbike National Championship race aboard a Kawasaki, but he is most closely associated with Honda and his partnership with Grand Prix tuner, Erv Kanemoto. He won all three of his world titles on Hondas with Kanemoto as head mechanic. Spencer had a short stint with the Agostini Yamaha team and ended his career on a Ducati in the US National Championship.

For many years, Spencer operated a motorcycle riding school, Freddie Spencer's High Performance Riding School, until October 2008. Primarily based in Las Vegas, Nevada, the school counted Nick Ienatsch and Ken Hill as chief instructor and lead instructor, respectively. After it closed, Ienatsch founded a successor-program, the Yamaha Champions Riding School.

Spencer now lives in London, England, and commentates on television for various racing series. For 2019 Spencer was appointed the chairman of the FIM MotoGP™ Stewards Panel.

Honors
 "Freddie Spencer Day", declared in 1984 by Mayor John Brennan Hussey in Shreveport after Spencer won the 500cc World Championship the previous year. Sheriff of Caddo Parish, Don Hathaway made Spencer an "honorary deputy" for the occasion.
 Inducted into the AMA Motorcycle Hall of Fame in 1999.
 Inducted into the Motorsports Hall of Fame of America in 2001.
 The FIM named him a Grand Prix "Legend" in 2001.
 Inducted Into the Louisiana Sports Hall of Fame in 2009.

Grand Prix career statistics
The following is a list of results achieved by Spencer.

Points system from 1968 to 1987.

Points system from 1988 to 1992.

(key) (Races in bold indicate pole position; races in italics indicate fastest lap)

Books

References

External links

Freddie Spencer at the AMA Hall of Fame
Retro SBK's Freddie Spencer Tribute 
Freddie Spencer career discussion - details of the injury that affected his GP success

American motorcycle racers
AMA Grand National Championship riders
500cc World Championship riders
250cc World Championship riders
AMA Superbike Championship riders
Superbike World Championship riders
Motorcycle trainers
Sportspeople from Shreveport, Louisiana
1961 births
Living people
Barber Pro Series drivers
500cc World Riders' Champions
250cc World Riders' Champions